The 1974 Lima earthquake occurred on October 3 at 14:21 UTC (09:21 local time). It was located at about 80 km southwest of Lima, Peru. The magnitude of the earthquake was put at 8.1 , or  7.8. The earthquake caused 78 deaths and left 2,400 injured.

Background
The intensity around Lima was generally about MM V to VII, but the maximum reached IX. Two buildings of reinforced concrete collapsed in La Molina, where the intensity was MM VIII to IX. A four-story reinforced concrete building in Callao collapsed.

The largest aftershock occurred on November 9, 1974, at 12:59 UTC (07:59 local time) with a magnitude of  7.1, or  7.1. The November 9 aftershock was located at about 25 km south of the main shock.

See also 
 List of earthquakes in 1974
 List of earthquakes in Peru

References

External links 

Lima earthquake, 1974
Earthquakes in Peru
1974 in Peru
October 1974 events in South America
Megathrust earthquakes in Peru
1974 disasters in Peru